William Bulloch (18 February 1883 – 10 February 1954) was a Scottish footballer who played mainly as a left back.

Although he began his career with short spells elsewhere including Port Glasgow Athletic, Tottenham Hotspur (signing along with Bobby Steel who established himself in London, while Bulloch did not make it out of their reserve team) and Kilmarnock, Bulloch featured primarily for Glasgow club Partick Thistle where he spent thirteen seasons (all in the top division), making 474 appearances for the Jags in all competitions and scoring 8 goals. He was captain of the Partick team that won the Scottish Cup in 1921 with a 1–0 win over Rangers.

Bulloch was selected twice for the Scottish Football League XI, and in 1921 toured North America with 'Scotland' (organised by Third Lanark).

References

1883 births
1954 deaths
Footballers from South Lanarkshire
Sportspeople from Larkhall
Scottish twins
Twin sportspeople
Scottish footballers
Association football defenders
Royal Albert F.C. players
Partick Thistle F.C. players
Kilmarnock F.C. players
Tottenham Hotspur F.C. players
Port Glasgow Athletic F.C. players
Scottish Football League players
Scottish Football League representative players
Partick Thistle F.C. non-playing staff
Association football coaches